Star Warrior is a 1980 science fiction role-playing video game.

Star Warrior or Star Warriors may also refer to:

 Star warrior, a group to which Kirby belongs in his anime series
 Star Warrior, a ring-name used by Bob Roop
 Star Wars: Star Warriors, a board game, spinoff of the West End Games' Star Wars role-playing game
 Star Warriors, a nickname for the VAQ-209 Electronic Attack Squadron
 Star Warriors : A Penetrating Look into the Lives of the Young Scientists Behind Our Space Age Weaponry, a 1985 book by William Broad
 The Five Star Warriors, a plot element of the video game Sakura Wars: So Long, My Love
 "Star Warrior: Silent Warrior", an episode of Robo Formers.
 Sternenkrieger (literally "Star Warriors"), a German release title for Nausicaä of the Valley of the Wind, a 1984 anime film
 Yamaha Road Star Warrior, a variant of the Yamaha XV1600A motorcycle